Guioa reticulata is a species of plant in the family Sapindaceae. It is endemic to the Philippines.

References

reticulata
Endemic flora of the Philippines
Trees of the Philippines
Critically endangered plants
Taxonomy articles created by Polbot